Lymanbensonieae is a tribe of cacti belonging to the Cactoideae subfamily. It was recently created after the genus Lymanbensonia was found to be sister to Calymmanthium.

Genera
Calymmanthium
Lymanbensonia

References

Cactoideae
Caryophyllales tribes